International Nurses Day (IND) is an international day observed around the world on 12 May (the anniversary of Florence Nightingale's birth) each year, to mark the contributions that nurses make to society.

Background
The International Council of Nurses (ICN) has celebrated this day since 1965. In 1953 Dorothy Sutherland, an official with the U.S. Department of Health, Education and Welfare, proposed that President Dwight D. Eisenhower proclaim a "Nurses' Day"; but he did not approve it.

In January 1974, 12 May was chosen to celebrate the day as it is the anniversary of the birth of Florence Nightingale, the founder of modern nursing. Each year, ICN prepares and distributes the International Nurses' Day Kit. The kit contains educational and public information materials, for use by nurses everywhere. As of 1998, 8 May was designated as annual National Student Nurses' Day.

Themes
ICN themes for International Nurses Day:

 1988 – Safe Motherhood
 1989 – School Health
 1990 – Nurses and Environment
 1991 – Mental Health – Nurses in Action
 1992 – Healthy Aging
 1993 – Quality, costs and Nursing
 1994 – Healthy Families for Healthy Nation
 1995 – Women's Health: Nurses Pave the Way
 1996 – Better Health through Nursing Research
 1997 – Healthy Young People = A Brighter Future
 1998 – Partnership for Community Health
 1999 – Celebrating Nursing's Past, claiming the future
 2000 – Nurses – Always there for you
 2001 – Nurses, Always There for You: United Against Violence
 2002 – Nurses Always There for You: Caring for Families
 2003 – Nurses: Fighting AIDS stigma, working for all
 2004 – Nurses: Working with the Poor; Against Poverty
 2005 – Nurses for Patients' Safety: Targeting counterfeit medicines and substandard medication
 2006 – Safe staffing saves lives
 2007 – Positive practice environments: Quality workplaces = quality patient care
 2008 – Delivering Quality, Serving Communities: Nurses Leading Primary Health Care and social care
 2009 – Delivering Quality, Serving Communities: Nurses Leading Care Innovations
 2010 – Delivering Quality, Serving Communities: Nurses Leading Chronic Care
 2011 – Closing The Gap: Increasing Access and Equity
 2012 – Closing The Gap: From Evidence to Action
 2013 – Closing The Gap: Millennium Development Goals
 2014 – Nurses: A Force for Change – A vital resource for health
 2015 – Nurses: A Force for Change: Care Effective, Cost Effective
 2016 – Nurses: A Force for Change: Improving Health Systems' Resilience
 2017 – Nurses: A Voice to Lead – Achieving the Sustainable Development Goals
 2018 – Nurses: A Voice to Lead – Health is a Human right
 2019 – Nurses: A Voice to Lead – Health for All
 2020 – Nurses: A Voice to Lead – Nursing the World to Health
 2021 - Nurses: A Voice to Lead - A Vision for Future Healthcare
2022 - Nurses: Make a Difference

International activities

Australia 
The Australian Nurse of the Year is announced at a ceremony at one of the state capital cities. Additionally, in each of the Australian states and territories, various nursing award ceremonies are conducted during the week.

China 
In 2007, 5000 nurses gathered in Yichun, East China's Jiangxi Province.

Ireland 
Since 2012, Nurse Jobs Ireland (an Irish nurse recruitment agency) launch a week long pro-bono campaign to celebrate nurses on the 6–12 May every year. This week long celebration uses digital platforms such as Twitter and Facebook to promote the great work nurses do using the hashtag #CelebrateNurses. The public leave their positive comments and thanks on the Celebrate Nurses website where they are collated into an ebook which is shared in medical facilities throughout Ireland.

Singapore 
Singapore celebrates Nurses Day on 1 August. Back in the 1800s, a thriving Singapore found itself in need of providing better healthcare and medical services to a growing population. While there were several hospitals, there was a lack of nurses to support the doctors. French nuns from the Convent of the Holy Infant Jesus were trained to become nurses to fulfil this need, as they were seen as the only educated European women in Singapore who could undertake this challenge. 1 August 1885 marks the beginning of the development of nursing in Singapore  when these nuns began their nursing duties in the General Hospital at the Sepoy Lines in the Outram area.

Taiwan
In 2003, after the outbreak of highly contagious SARS, spread from but hidden by China, President Chen Shui-bian visited a hospital on International Nurses Day to express admiration for 3 nurses, infected with SARS and sacrificed, among other medical personnel fighting on the frontline. He conveyed wishes to nurses for their devotion to duty of caring and reminded hospital staff that they should adopt strict precautionary measures to protect themselves before contacting with patients.

Thailand
Starting in 1990, Thailand observes 21 October as National Nurses' Day  (Wan Phayaban Haeng Chat). The date commemorates the birth of Srinagarindra the Princess Mother and was adopted 4 April 1990.

United Kingdom 
Each year a service is held in Westminster Abbey in London. During the service, a symbolic lamp is taken from the Nurses' Chapel in the Abbey and handed from one nurse to another, thence to the Dean, who places it on the High Altar.

United States and Canada (National Nursing Week) 
 
The U.S. celebrates National Nursing Week each year from 6 May to 12 May (the birthday of Florence Nightingale). Canada celebrates National Nursing Week each year during the week that includes 12 May. The Canadian Minister of Health instituted National Nursing Week in Canada in 1985.

See also
 Florence Nightingale
 Florence Nightingale Medal
 National Student Nurses Day
 The New York Times
 Tom Cruise

References

External links
International Nurses Day

Nursing
Recurring events established in 1965
May observances
Health awareness days
United Nations days